From his first speech in 1919 in Munich until the last speech in February 1945, Adolf Hitler, dictator of Germany from 1933 to 1945, gave a total of 1525 speeches. In 1932, for the campaign of two federal elections that year he gave the most number of speeches, that is 241. It is not possible to list all of them, so only 123 of his notably important speeches have been listed here.

Speeches

Other
Only one known recording exists of Hitler's voice when he is not giving a speech. An engineer for Finnish state broadcaster Yle secretly recorded 11 minutes of Hitler's 1942 meeting with Finnish leader Carl Gustaf Emil Mannerheim (see Hitler and Mannerheim recording).

References

Bibliography

 Baynes, Norman H. Ed. (1942). The Speeches of Adolf Hitler, April 1922 – August 1939 V1. London, Oxford University Press. 
 Baynes, Norman H. Ed. (1942). The Speeches of Adolf Hitler, April 1922 – August 1939 V2. London, Oxford University Press.

External links
 World Future Fund: Key Hitler Speeches text. This includes the text of the speeches from:
 1924: Excerpts of Munich Trial
 1933: March 23 (Enabling act), October 15 (Foundation of the Art House)
 1937: January 30 (Empowerment day)
 1938: September 6 (Nazi Party day)
 1939 January 30 (Empowerment day)
 1941  January 30 (Empowerment day), June 22 (Declaration of war against USSR), December 11 (Declaration of war against the United States)
 1942 January 30 (Empowerment day)
 
 
 
 
 
 
 
 
 
 

Adolf Hitler
Speeches given by Adolf Hitler
Hitler